GDH may refer to:

 Gajirrabeng dialect, native to Australia
 GDH 559, a Thai film production company
 Glutamate dehydrogenase
 Gonzo (company), previously GDH K.K., a Japanese anime studio
 Gordon Hill railway station, in London
 Gosford Hospital
 Grand Ducal Highness
 Guangdong Holdings, a Chinese holding company